Sir Peter Gilmour Noto Badge (20 November 1931 – 29 October 2020) was a British solicitor and judge who was Chief Metropolitan Stipendiary Magistrate from 1992 to 1997. As Chief Magistrate, he handled a series of high-profile committals, including those of Szymon Serafinowicz under the War Crimes Act 1991 and of Rosemary West.

He was also a leading authority on coracles. The founder, then chairman and president of the Coracle Society, he said in 1997 that “coracles and currachs are my main obsession in life.”

References 

 https://www.telegraph.co.uk/obituaries/2020/11/07/sir-peter-badge-magistrate-world-authority-coracles-obituary/
 https://www.thetimes.co.uk/article/sir-peter-badge-88-prosecutor-at-the-maze-in-the-1970s-and-coracle-expert-w6xnktxjb
 https://www.ukwhoswho.com/view/10.1093/ww/9780199540891.001.0001/ww-9780199540884-e-6113

1931 births
2020 deaths
Knights Bachelor
English solicitors
Circuit judges (England and Wales)
Stipendiary magistrates (England and Wales)
Royal Naval Volunteer Reserve personnel
Royal Naval Reserve personnel
Liberal Party (UK) parliamentary candidates
Alumni of the University of Liverpool